The Curaçao women's national football team is overseen by the Curaçao Football Federation. Formally representing Netherlands Antilles, the team changed jurisdiction in 2010 when Bonaire gained autonomy from the Netherlands.

Results and fixtures

The following is a list of match results in the last 12 months, as well as any future matches that have been scheduled.

Legend

2022

Coaching staff

Current coaching staff

Managerial history
 Marizol Boomberg (20??-2021)
 Ana Vargas (2021-)

Players

Current squad

Recent call-ups
The following players have been called up to Curaçao squad in the past 12 months.

Records

*Active players in bold, statistics correct as of 2020.

Most capped players

Top goalscorers

Competitive record
FIFA Women's World Cup*Draws include knockout matches decided on penalty kicks.CONCACAF W Championship*Draws include knockout matches decided on penalty kicks.''

Honours

See also

Curaçao national football team
Curaçao national football team results
List of Curaçao international footballers
Curaçao national under-23 football team
Curaçao national under-20 football team
Curaçao national under-17 football team
Curaçao national futsal team
Curaçao national beach soccer team
Curaçao women's national football team
Curaçao women's national football team results
List of Curaçao women's international footballers
Curaçao women's national under-20 football team
Curaçao women's national under-17 football team

References

External links
Curaçao women's national football team – official website at FFK 
FIFA Team Profile at FIFA